John Connor (born 1893) was an English professional footballer who played as an outside right for Huddersfield Town.

References

1893 births
Year of death missing
Sportspeople from Durham, England
Footballers from County Durham
English footballers
Association football outside forwards
Huddersfield Town A.F.C. players
English Football League players